Shuyesheh (also Romanized as Shūyesheh; also known as Shavīsheh and Shevīsheh) is a city and capital of Kalatrazan District, in Sanandaj County, Kurdistan Province, Iran. At the 2006 census, its population was 1,136, in 280 families. The city is populated by Kurds.

References

Towns and villages in Sanandaj County
Cities in Kurdistan Province
Kurdish settlements in Kurdistan Province